Łagiewka or Łągiewka is a Polish surname. Notable people with the surname include:

 Adam Łagiewka (born 1982), Polish footballer
 Krzysztof Łągiewka (born 1983), Polish footballer

See also
 

Polish-language surnames